Tim He Yi-ming (born 14 April 1962) is a Chinese former badminton player who later started to represent Hong Kong. He competed in two events at the 1996 Summer Olympics.

References

External links
 

1962 births
Living people
Hong Kong male badminton players
Olympic badminton players of Hong Kong
Badminton players at the 1996 Summer Olympics
Place of birth missing (living people)